Major Attwood Alfred Torrens (13 February 1874 – 8 December 1916) was an English cricketer and army officer.

Attwood Torrens was educated at Harrow School before going to work at the stock exchange. He had played only school and club cricket when he was selected to tour New Zealand in 1906-07 with an MCC team of amateur cricketers. 

A lower-order batsman and medium-paced bowler, he made his first-class debut in the tour match against Wellington on Christmas Day 1906. His form was modest until late in the tour, when in the two-day match against a Wairarapa XV he took 11 wickets. In the next first-class match, against Hawke's Bay, he made the top score of the match with 87 and took 3 for 44 and 2 for 28. He was selected to play in the two matches against New Zealand that followed immediately, but was not successful.

After the tour Torrens continued to play club cricket in England, including two first-class matches for MCC and one for the Free Foresters. He never played county cricket.

He was commissioned in the Royal Artillery in 1915 and left for the front in May 1916. By December 1916 he was Major commanding D Battery of 307th Brigade, Royal Field Artillery. He was killed by a shell fragment at Pozières on 8 December 1916 while running across open ground in an attempt to move his men to safety. He is buried in the Pozières British Cemetery.

References

External links

1874 births
1916 deaths
People from Hayes, Bromley
People educated at Harrow School
Marylebone Cricket Club cricketers
English cricketers
Free Foresters cricketers
British military personnel killed in World War I
Royal Field Artillery officers
British Army personnel of World War I
Military personnel from Kent
Burials in Hauts-de-France